The 2019 World Single Distances Speed Skating Championships was held between 7 and 10 February 2019 at the Max Aicher Arena in Inzell, Germany.

Schedule
All times are local (UTC+1).

Medal summary

Medal table

Men's events

Women's events

References

  
2019 Single Distances
2019 in speed skating
World Single Distances, 2019
2019 in German sport
February 2019 sports events in Germany